Cheuquemó Formation is a geological formation of sedimentary rock in south-central Chile. The sediments of the formation were deposited during the Late Oligocene and Early Miocene epochs. The formations lower sections are made up of conglomerate, then successions of sandstone, tuff and mudstone rich in organic material follows. The formation indicates that sedimentation occurred in an estuarine (paralic) and other non-marine (continental) environments. It contains fossils of the following genera: Mytilus, Cardium and Turritella. Stratigraphically it overlies the Bahía Mansa Metamorphic Complex and underlies the Miocene Santo Domingo Formation.

Description 
The formation is very similar to the Pupunahue Beds found further north, with the sole difference that the fossil assemblage in both seem to indicate different ages. While Cheuquemó is possibly about 14 million years old (Miocene), the Pupunahue Beds are 35–25 million years old.

See also 
 Coal mining in Chile

References 

Geologic formations of Chile
Miocene Series of South America
Oligocene Series of South America
Chattian Stage
Aquitanian (stage)
Burdigalian
Paleogene Chile
Neogene Chile
Conglomerate formations
Sandstone formations
Mudstone formations
Coal formations
Coal in Chile
Tuff formations
Geology of Los Lagos Region